In physics, engineering, and applied mathematics, the Bickley–Naylor functions are a sequence of special functions arising in formulas for thermal radiation intensities in hot enclosures. The solutions are often quite complicated unless the problem is essentially one-dimensional (such as the radiation field in a thin layer of gas between two parallel rectangular plates). These functions have practical applications in several engineering problems related to transport of thermal or neutron, radiation in systems with special symmetries (e.g. spherical or axial symmetry). W. G. Bickley was a British mathematician born in 1893.

Definition 

The nth Bickley−Naylor function  is defined by

 

and it is classified as one of the generalized exponential integral functions.

Properties 

The integral defining the function  generally cannot be evaluated analytically, but can be approximated to a desired accuracy with Riemann sums or other methods, taking the limit as a → 0 in the interval of integration, [a, /2].

Alternative ways to define the function  include the integral, integral forms the Bickley-Naylor function:

 

 

 

 

 

where  is the modified Bessel function of the zeroth order. Also by definition we have .

Series expansions 

The series expansions of the first and second order Bickley functions are given by:

 

 

where  is the Euler constant and

Recurrence relation 

The Bickley functions also satisfy the following recurrence relation:

 
where .

Asymptotic expansions 

The asymptotic expansions of Bickley functions are given as

 
 for

Successive differentiation 

Differentiating  with respect to x gives

 

Successive differentiation yields
 
 

The values of these functions for different values of the argument x were often listed in tables of special functions in the era when numerical calculation of integrals was slow. A table that lists some approximate values of the three first functions Kin is shown below.

Computer code 

Computer code in Fortran is made available by Amos.

See also 

 Exponential integral

References 

Special functions